The Wade Park District is an historic district on the National Register of Historic Places, located in the University Circle neighborhood on the east side of Cleveland, Ohio. The district, which covers roughly 650 acres, is bounded by Chester Avenue and Euclid Avenue (which converge in a triangle) on the south, East Boulevard to the east and E. 105th Street to the west. The district, which includes seven separate buildings, features several of the city's cultural institutions, as well as the park of the same name.

History
Jeptha Wade arrived in Cleveland in the 1850s, already having amassed part of his fortune in the telegraph industry, and proceeded to become one of the city's wealthiest residents by expanding his holdings into the industries of steel and banking. Like Marcus Hanna, John D Rockefeller and John Severance, his contemporaries along Euclid Avenue's 'Millionaire's Row', Wade used his industrial wealth to endow cultural and educational institutions. In 1882, he donated  of land east of the city for the purpose of creating a park, which was named in his honor. Today, the bequeathed Wade property serves as the campus for some of Cleveland's best-known tourist attractions.

Wade Park

While not part of the NRHP listing, Wade Park was constructed from land donated by Jeptha Wade, who expressly intended part of it as the location for an art museum. Today, the most prominent features of Wade Park are the Cleveland Museum of Art and the adjacent Wade Park Lagoon, both of which sit at the park's main entrance at southern tip of the historic district.

Attractions

Cleveland Museum of Art
Cleveland Botanical Gardens
Cleveland Institute of Art
Cleveland Institute of Music
Severance Hall
Cleveland Museum of Natural History
Western Reserve Historical Society
Crawford Auto-Aviation Museum
Epworth Euclid Church

References

National Register of Historic Places in Cleveland, Ohio
Historic districts in Cleveland
Tourist attractions in Cleveland
University Circle